The 1967 Individual Speedway World Championship was the 22nd edition of the official World Championship to determine the world champion rider.

At Wembley in front of a 70,000 crowd Ove Fundin won a record fifth title, one year after Barry Briggs had equalled his record in 1966. Fellow Swede Bengt Jansson took silver and New Zealander Ivan Mauger took bronze, improving on his fourth place position the previous year.

Format changes
The format of the Championship changed for the 1967 event. It reverted back to the 1965 system whereby riders from the European Final and British/Commonwealth Final would qualify for the World Final to be held at Wembley Stadium in London. However the European Final would now see 10 riders qualifying for the final.

First round
British & Commonwealth Qualifying - 32 to British & Commonwealth semi finals
Scandinavian Qualifying - 16 to Nordic Final
Continental Qualifying - 16 to Continental Final

British Qualifying

Scandinavian Qualifying

Continental Qualifying

Second round
British/Commonwealth semi finals - 16 to British/Commonwealth Final
Scandinavian Final - 8 to European Final
Continental Final - 8 to European Final

British/Commonwealth semi finals

Nordic Final
 June 4, 1967
 Hillerød
 First 8 to European Final plus 1 reserve

Continental Final
 August 20, 1967
  Kempten
 First 8 to European Final plus 1 reserve

Third round
British/Commonwealth Final - 6 to World Final
European Final - 10 to World Final

British/Commonwealth Final
 August 22, 1967
 West Ham
 First 6 to World Final plus 1 reserve

European Final
 August 27, 1967
  Wroclaw
 First 10 to World Final plus 1 reserve

World Final
September 16, 1967
 London, Wembley Stadium

References

1967
Individual Speedway World Championship
Individual Speedway World Championship
Individual Speedway World Championship
Speedway competitions in the United Kingdom